Whent is a surname. Notable people with the surname include:

Gerry Whent (1927–2002), British businessman 
Jack Whent (1920–1999), British footballer
Sean Whent, American police chief